M.S.Ö. Air and Space Museum is located at Sivrihisar Aviation Center, Eskişehir, Turkey. The museum is open every day except Mondays and admission to the museum is free. The museum has both airworthy historical aircraft and static displays.

Museum
The museum is directly connected to the west apron at the Sivrihisar Aviation Center, where airworthy aircraft can leave the hangars at once and perform display flights. The main entrance of the museum is through the B gate of Sivrihisar Aviation Center. The museum building consists of four hangars and houses various exhibits ranging from engines to dioramas to aircraft. The building also houses the Aeronautical Information Service office and a museum store.

Exhibits
The airworthy aircraft on display include:
 North American P-51 Mustang "Ferocious Frankie" Ser. No. 44-13704  
 Douglas DC-3 "Turkish Delight" Ser. No. 2204
 North American T-6 Texan "Happy Hour" Ser. No. SA079
 Boeing-Stearman Model 75  
 Antonov An-2 Ser. No. 17805
 Cessna 195

The museum also hosts aviation-related events, for example, the Women and World Aviation Symposium planned for March 2020.

See also
List of aerospace museums
List of surviving North American P-51 Mustangs

References

External links
M.S.Ö. Air & Space Museum
Location Info
Hürriyet: "Bozkırın ortasındaki bu müze 'uçuruyor'" 25 April 2019
Iktibasdergisi.com: "Havacılık ve Uzay müzesinde uçuş imkanı". 26 April 2019

Aerospace museums in Turkey
Sivrihisar District
Transport museums in Turkey
Museums established in 2018
2018 establishments in Turkey